A paper mill is a factory devoted to making paper from vegetable fibres such as wood pulp, old rags, and other ingredients. Prior to the invention and adoption of the Fourdrinier machine and other types of paper machine that use an endless belt, all paper in a paper mill was made by hand, one sheet at a time, by specialized laborers.

History 

Historical investigations into the origin of the paper mill are complicated by differing definitions and loose terminology from modern authors: Many modern scholars use the term to refer indiscriminately to all kinds of mills, whether powered by humans, by animals or by water. Their propensity to refer to any ancient paper manufacturing center as a "mill", without further specifying its exact power source, has increased the difficulty of identifying the particularly efficient and historically important water-powered type.

Human and animal-powered mills 
The use of human and animal powered mills was known to Muslim and Chinese papermakers. However, evidence for water-powered paper mills is elusive among both prior to the 11th century. The general absence of the use of water-powered paper mills in Muslim papermaking prior to the 11th century is suggested by the habit of Muslim authors at the time to call a production center not a "mill", but a "paper manufactory".

Scholars have identified paper mills in Abbasid-era Baghdad in 794–795. The evidence that waterpower was applied to papermaking at this time is a matter of scholarly debate. In the Moroccan city of Fez, Ibn Battuta speaks of "400 mill stones for paper". Since Ibn Battuta does not mention the use of water-power and such a number of water-mills would be grotesquely high, the passage is generally taken to refer to human or animal force.

Water-powered mills

An exhaustive survey of milling in Al-Andalus did not uncover water-powered paper mills, nor do the Spanish books of property distribution (Repartimientos) after the Christian reconquest refer to any. Arabic texts never use the term mill in connection with papermaking, and the most thorough account of Muslim papermaking at the time, the one by the Zirid Sultan Al-Muizz ibn Badis, describes the art purely in terms of a handcraft. Donald Hill has identified a possible reference to a water-powered paper mill in Samarkand, in the 11th-century work of the Persian scholar Abu Rayhan Biruni, but concludes that the passage is "too brief to enable us to say with certainty" that it refers to a water-powered paper mill. This is seen by Leor Halevi as evidence of Samarkand first harnessing waterpower in the production of paper, but notes that it is not known if waterpower was applied to papermaking elsewhere across the Islamic world at the time. Robert I. Burns remains sceptical, given the isolated occurrence of the reference and the prevalence of manual labour in Islamic papermaking elsewhere prior to the 13th century.

Hill notes that paper mills appear in early Christian Catalan documentation from the 1150s, which may imply Islamic origins, but that hard evidence is lacking. Burns, however, has dismissed the case for early Catalan water-powered paper mills, after re-examination of the evidence.

The identification of early hydraulic stamping mills in medieval documents from Fabriano, Italy, is also completely without substance.

Clear evidence of a water-powered paper mill dates to 1282 in the Spanish Kingdom of Aragon. A decree by the Christian king Peter III addresses the establishment of a royal "molendinum", a proper hydraulic mill, in the paper manufacturing center of Xàtiva. This early hydraulic paper mill was operated by Muslims in the Moorish quarter of Xàtiva, though it appears to have been resented by sections of the local Muslim papermakering community; the document guarantees them the right to continue the way of traditional papermaking by beating the pulp manually and grants them the right to be exempted from work in the new mill.

The first permanent paper mill north of the Alps was established in Nuremberg by Ulman Stromer in 1390; it is later depicted in the lavishly illustrated Nuremberg Chronicle. From the mid-14th century onwards, European paper milling underwent a rapid improvement of many work processes.

The size of a paper mill prior to the use of industrial machines was described by counting the number of vats it had. Thus, a "one vat" paper mill had only one vatman, one coucher, and other laborers.

15th century 
The first reference to a paper mill in England was in a book printed by Wynken de Worde c. 1495; the mill, near Hertford, belonged to John Tate.

19th century 

An early attempt at a machine to mechanise the process was patented in 1799 by the Frenchman Nicholas Louis Robert; it was not deemed a success. In 1801, however, the drawings were brought to England by John Gamble and passed on to brothers Henry and Sealy Fourdrinier, who financed the engineer Bryan Donkin to construct the machine. Their first successful machine was installed at Frogmore, Hertfordshire, in 1803.
In 1809 in the Apsley Mill, right next to Frogmore Mill, John Dickinson patented and installed another kind of paper machine. Rather than pouring a dilute pulp suspension onto an endlessly revolving flat wire, this machine used a cylinder covered in wire as the mould. A cylindrical mould is partially submerged in the vat, containing a pulp suspension, and then, as the mould rotates, the water is sucked through the wire, leaving a thin layer of fibres deposited on the cylinder. These cylinder-mould machines, as they are named, were strong competition for Fourdrinier machine makers. They were the type of machine first used by the North American paper industry.  It is estimated that by 1850 UK paper production had reached 100,000 tons. Later developments increased the size and capacity of machines as well as seeking high volume alternative pulp sources from which paper could be reliably produced. Many of the earlier mills were small and had been located in rural areas. The movement was to larger mills in, or near, urban areas closer to their suppliers of the raw materials. They were often situated near a port where the raw material was brought in by ship and the paper markets. By the end of the century there were less than 300 UK paper mills, employing 35,000 people and producing 650,000 tons of paper per year.

20th century 

By the early 20th century, paper mills sprang up around New England and the rest of the world, due to the high demand for paper. The United States, with its infrastructure and mill towns, was the largest producer in the world. Chief among these in paper production was Holyoke, Massachusetts, which was the largest producer of paper in the world by 1885, and home to engineers D. H. & A. B. Tower who oversaw the largest firm of paper millwrights in the US during that decade, designing mills on five continents. However, as 20th century progressed this diaspora moved further north and west in the United States, with access to greater pulp supplies and labor. At this time, there were many world leaders of the production of paper; one such was the Brown Company in Berlin, New Hampshire run by William Wentworth Brown. During the year 1907, the Brown Company cut between 30 and 40 million acres of woodlands on their property, which extended from La Tuque, Quebec, Canada to West Palm, Florida.

In the 1920s, Nancy Baker Tompkins represented large paper manufacturing companies, like Hammermill Paper Company, Honolulu Paper Company and Appleton Coated Paper Company to promote sales to the distributors of paper products. It was said to be the only business of its kind in the world, and was started in 1931 by Tompkins. It prospered in spite of the business depression.

"Log drives" were conducted on local rivers to send the logs to the mills. By the late 20th and early 21st-century, paper mills began to close, and the log drives became a dying craft. Due to the addition of new machinery, many millworkers were laid off and many of the historic paper mills closed.

Characteristics

Paper mills can be fully integrated mills or nonintegrated mills. Integrated mills consist of a pulp mill and a paper mill on the same site. Such mills receive logs or wood chips and produce paper.

The modern paper mill uses large amounts of energy, water, and wood pulp in an efficient and complex series of processes, and control technology to produce a sheet of paper that can be used in diverse ways. The two main suppliers of paper machines are Metso and Voith.

See also 
Cutting stock problem
List of paper mills
Paper pollution

Notes

Sources 

Tsien, Tsuen-Hsuin: "Science and Civilisation in China", Chemistry and Chemical Technology (Vol. 5), Paper and Printing (Part 1), Cambridge University Press, 1985

External links

List of International graphic paper mills
Paperweb.biz - Paper world directory and search engine for the pulp and paper world
List of paper mills on paper and print monthly

 
Pulp and paper industry
Papermaking
Industrial buildings
Arab inventions

fr:Papeterie